Dan Lederman (born November 25, 1972 in Waterloo, Iowa) is an American politician who served as a Republican member of the South Dakota Senate representing District 16 from January 11, 2011 until he resigned on March 30, 2015.  Lederman served consecutively in the South Dakota Legislature from January 2009 until January 11, 2011 in the South Dakota House of Representatives District 16 seat.

In February 2017, Lederman was elected State Chairman of the South Dakota Republican Party in the first contested party chair election in decades.  In February 2019, Lederman was re-elected on an uncontested basis to another term of office as chair of the South Dakota Republican Party. In January 2023, Lederman did not seek re-election and was succeeded by John Wiik.

Education
Lederman received his combat medic training at United States Army Medical Department Center and studied fine arts and religion at the University of Iowa.

Employment
Since the late 1990s, Lederman has been a partner in the family owned Lederman Bail Bonds business, founded by his father.

Lederman serves as a Senior Advisor to Des Moines, IA based LS2 Group, working in grassroots organizing, media relations, political event planning, and social media for the organization.  On October 12, 2016, Lederman registered with the Department of Justice's Foreign Agents Registration Act (FARA) office as an agent of the Kingdom of Saudi Arabia for purposes of lobbying for changes to the Justice Against Sponsors of Terrorism Act (JASTA). Projecting a fee of $8,500 for his services, Lederman registered in his capacity as a senior advisor at LS2 Group.  LS2group received $76,500 in compensation for its work on the Saudi campaign against JASTA.

Elections

South Dakota House of Representatives
 2006 To challenge House District 16 incumbent Democratic Representative Margaret V. Gillespie, Lederman and incumbent Republican Representative Joel Dykstra were unopposed for the June 6, 2006 Republican Primary, but in the four-way November 7, 2006 General election Republican Representative Dykstra took the first seat and Democratic Representative Gillespie took the second seat ahead of Lederman and Democratic nominee Ron Jenkins.
 2008 When District 16 incumbent Democratic Representative Gillespie ran for South Dakota Senate and Republican Representative Dykstra left the Legislature leaving both District 16 seats open, Lederman ran in the three-way June 3, 2008 Republican Primary and placed first with 2,546 votes (53.69%); in the four-way November 4, 2008 General election Lederman took the first seat with 6,594 votes (33.86%) and fellow Republican nominee Jim Bolin took the second seat ahead of Democratic nominees Janelle O'Connor and Brian Wells.
 2010 When Senate District 16 incumbent Democratic Senator Gillespie left the Legislature and left the seat open, Lederman was unopposed for the June 8, 2010 Republican Primary and won the November 2, 2010 General election with 6,082 votes (62.71%) against Democratic nominee Kathy Hill.
 2012 Lederman was unopposed for the June 5, 2012 Republican Primary and won the November 6, 2012 General election with 6,604 votes (60.04%) against Democratic nominee Michael O'Connor.

South Dakota State Senate
 2014 In the race for District 16 State Senate, Lederman defeated Democrat Ann Tornberg on a vote of 56% to 44%.  With Lederman's election to State Chair of the South Dakota Republican Party, he again found himself at opposite political positions with Tornberg, who herself had been elected to be chairwoman of the South Dakota Democratic Party. Lederman resigned on March 30, 2015.

South Dakota Presidential Elector
2020 Lederman served as an elector for the 2020 presidential election, replacing Kristi Noem.  Lederman voted for President Donald Trump for president and Vice-President Mike Pence for vice president.

Electoral history

Voter Registration Controversy 
On October 11, 2017, Republican Gubernatorial Candidate Lora Hubbel sent out a press release claiming Lederman's Iowa voter registration was still in force. In reporting the story, the media noted that Hubbel had changed parties herself a few months earlier. In an interview with KELO radio, South Dakota Secretary of State Shantel Krebs indicated that since Lederman used "Dan Lederman" when he originally registered in Iowa and "Daniel Isaac Lederman" when registering in South Dakota, the name was not removed from the Iowa voter roll at the time, because it " would not be an exact match and wouldn't have been caught in the de-duplicating process that Secretary of States use."  Lederman responded to the candidate's criticism in an op-ed released to the media the following day titled "OK to change parties in America.

References

External links
 Official page at the South Dakota Legislature
 Campaign site
 
 Dan Lederman at Ballotpedia
 Dan Lederman at the National Institute on Money in State Politics
 Dan Lederman Profile at South Dakota Republican Party

1972 births
Living people
Republican Party members of the South Dakota House of Representatives
People from Union County, South Dakota
Politicians from Waterloo, Iowa
Republican Party South Dakota state senators
State political party chairs of South Dakota
United States Army soldiers
University of Iowa alumni
2020 United States presidential electors